René Eugène Joseph Nicoly (22 September 1907 in Avon (Seine-et-Marne) - 22 may 1971 in the 9th arrondissement of Paris) was the founding president of the Jeunesses musicales de France.

Bibliography 
 Bulletins des Jeunesses Musicales de France, 1943-1971.
 Dominique Leroy, Économie des arts du spectacle vivant, éditions L'Harmattan, 1992.
 Gilles Lefebvre, Michel Rudel-Tessier, La musique d'une vie, éditions Fides, 1993.
 Myriam Chimènes, Josette Alviset, La Vie musicale sous Vichy, éditions Complexe, 2001.
 Jacques Lonchampt, Voyage à travers l'Opéra: de Cavalieri à Wagner, éditions L'Harmattan, 2002.
 Sylvie Saint-Cyr, Vers une démocratisation de L'opéra, éditions L'Harmattan, 2005.
 Pauline Adenot, Les musiciens d'orchestre symphonique: De la vocation au désenchantement, éditions L'Harmattan, 2008.
 Gérard Regnier, Jazz et société sous l'Occupation, éditions L'Harmattan, 2009.
 Erik Baeck, André Cluytens: itinéraire d'un chef d'orchestre, éditions Mardaga, 2009.

External links 
 Official website of the JM France
 Cimetière d'Avon

 

1907 births
1971 deaths
People from Seine-et-Marne
Officiers of the Légion d'honneur
Officiers of the Ordre des Arts et des Lettres
Knights of the Order of the Crown (Belgium)
Directors of the Paris Opera